

See also
Museums Galleries Scotland
National Galleries of Scotland

References

Art museums
Scotland
Art museums
Museums, art
Scotland